Jhoola is a 1962 Hindi-language romance film written by Rajendra Krishan and directed by K. Shankar. The film starred Vyjayanthimala and Sunil Dutt in the lead, after their successful collaboration in Sadhna (1958). The lead actors were supported by Pran, Rajendranath, Manmohan Krishna, Achala Sachdev, Leela Mishra, Randhir, Raj Mehra, Mohan Choti, Indira Bansal, Kusum Thakur and Tun Tun. The film was produced by N. Vasudeva Menon and was distributed by Vasu Films. The film's score was composed by Salil Chowdhury with lyrics provided by Rajendra Krishan. Editing was done by Shivaji Awdhut and was filmed by K. H. Kapadia. The film is a remake of the Tamil film Kairasi (1960).

Cast 
 Vyjayanthimala as Sumati
 Sunil Dutt as Dr. Arun
 Pran as Dharamraj / Mirza Singapori / Rai Bahadur Shyamlal Bihari
 Rajendranath as Madhu
 Manmohan Krishna as Head Constable Sundarlal
 Achala Sachdev as Kamla
 Leela Mishra as Dharamraj's employee
 Randhir as Shekhar
 Raj Mehra as Judge Ramkrishan
 Mohan Choti as Madhu's assistant
 Indira Bansal	as Daughter
 Kusum Thakur as Sushilla
 Tun Tun as Mother

Soundtrack 
The film's score was composed by Salil Chowdhury with lyrics were by Rajendra Krishan

References

External links 
 
 Jhoola profile at Upperstall.com

1960s Hindi-language films
1960s romantic musical films
1962 films
Films directed by K. Shankar
Films scored by Salil Chowdhury
Hindi remakes of Tamil films
Indian black-and-white films
Indian romantic musical films